The cuisine of the nation state of Solomon Islands has developed over 5000 years of inhabitation and external influences. From the Spanish, the islands received cattle; from the Asians and Indians, spices, exotic vegetables and fruit.

The islands were later colonies by the English, who left their own culinary mark. The main occupations of the locals are fishing and agriculture, so fish, coconuts, cassava, sweet potatoes and a variety of fruits and vegetables figure into the local cuisine.

Fundamentals
Cooking techniques include baking, boiling and frying. Special dishes are made using all kinds of ingredients. Fish is the staple meat in the Solomon Islands cuisine. Usually any meat is cooked and served with sweet potatoes, rice, taro roots, cassava, taro leaves and many other vegetables. Beside the local traditional cuisine many dishes from both European and Asian culture can be easily found and served in any restaurant or household of this country.

Notable dishes
Distinctive dishes of the Solomons include:
Ulu (breadfruit), can be served with any dish
 Bananas and other exotic fruits, sometimes wrapped in pearl cassava and served with whipped cream or caramel
Poi, made with fermented taro roots; served during any Solomonian celebration. This dish can be served with chicken or fish, or made like a porridge. Also served frequently during holidays is tapioca or pearl cassava, generally served like a pudding.

See also

Culture of Solomon Islands

References

External links